MYV Pops (stylised as MYV☆POPS) is the fourth studio album by Miyavi. It was released on August 2, 2006 and charted 15th on Oricon. Its limited edition comes with an additional DVD, containing a documentary with back stage footage of the artist's previous tour and the making of the music video for "Kimi ni Negai Wo". The first album singles, "Señor Señora Señorita/Gigpig Boogie" and "Kimi ni Negai Wo" charted as tenth and twenty-sixth respectively. This was the first album, where his style shifted towards a more pop sound, wanting to "study pop music in [his] own way".

Track listing

References

2006 albums
Miyavi albums